Mackenzie is a south-eastern suburb in the City of Brisbane, Queensland, Australia.

Geography
The area is partially covered by undeveloped bushland.

History
Mount Petrie State School opened on 31 March 1955.

Mount Gravatt Special School opened on 17 May 1971. On 21 September 2012, it was relocated to Mackenzie where it was co-located with Mount Petrie State School, with the schools being renamed MacKenzie State Primary School and Mackenzie Special School.

The median age of the Mackenzie population was 36 years of age, 1 year below the Australian median. 71.4% of people living in Mackenzie were born in Australia, compared to the national average of 69.8%; the next most common countries of birth were England 3.1%, New Zealand 3.1%, South Africa 2.8%, Sri Lanka 1.5%, Hong Kong 1.1%. 79.5% of people spoke only English at home; the next most popular languages were 2.6% Cantonese, 2.3% Greek, 1.4% Sinhalese, 1.3% Afrikaans, 1% Serbian.

Education 
Mackenzie State Primary School is a government primary (Prep-6) school for boys and girls at 26 Vivaldi Place. In 2018, the school had an enrolment of 134 students with 11 teachers (9 full-time equivalent) and 7 non-teaching staff (4 full-time equivalent).

Mackenzie State Special School is a special primary and secondary (Prep-12) school for boys and girls at 26 Vivaldi Place. In 2018, the school had an enrolment of 115 students with 36 teachers (28 full-time equivalent) and 46 non-teaching staff (28 full-time equivalent).

There is no mainstream secondary school in Mackenzie. The nearest government secondary school is Mansfield State High School in neighbouring Mansfield to the west.

Facilities
There is a petrol station located in Mackenzie. A number of residential estates with hundreds of new houses have been built in this suburb in the last decade. This is a suburb containing no large or small shopping centres. There has been a recent addition of a fitness station near the park.

Amenities 
ThreeSixteen Wesleyan Methodist Church is at 519 Mount Petrie Road. Hesed Grace (Chinese) Church, Mackenzie Samoan Church and Unity in Christ Tongan Church also hold services there. They are all part of the Wesleyan Methodist Church of Australia.

Gateway Baptist Church has a campus at 1052 Mount Gravatt Capalaba Road.

Transport 

Neighbouring suburbs include Belmont, Carindale, Mansfield, Rochedale, Upper Mount Gravatt, Wishart, Burbank and Chandler. Major roads such as Mount Gravatt – Capalaba Road and Gateway Motorway run through Mackenzie.

Mt Gravatt Bus services around Mackenzie, buses can access to Queen Elizabeth II Hospital, Garden City and City.

See also
 List of Brisbane suburbs

References

External links

 

Suburbs of the City of Brisbane